Naomi Roht-Arriaza is an American lawyer, currently a Distinguished Professor at University of California, Hastings.

References

Year of birth missing (living people)
Living people
University of California, Hastings faculty
American lawyers
American women lawyers
University of California, Berkeley alumni
Place of birth missing (living people)